Ruunaanjärvi, or Lake Ruunaa, is a medium-sized lake in the Vuoksi main catchment area in Finland. It is located in the Northern Karelia region and Lieksa municipality. The lake is a part of Ruunaa Hiking Center, which is famous for the possibilities to white water kayaking.

See also
List of lakes in Finland

References

Lakes of Lieksa